Óscar Renan López (born 27 February 1992) is a Nicaraguan footballer who plays for Managua F.C.

References

1992 births
Living people
Nicaraguan men's footballers
Nicaragua international footballers
Managua F.C. players
Association football forwards
2017 Copa Centroamericana players
2017 CONCACAF Gold Cup players
Sportspeople from Managua
2019 CONCACAF Gold Cup players